Sony Dwi Kuncoro (born 7 July 1984) is a badminton singles player from Indonesia. He was the 2004 Olympic bronze medalist,  two-time World Championships medalist (silver–2007, bronze–2009) and three-time Asian Champion (2002, 2003, 2005). He reached a career high as world number 3 in 7 October 2004.

Personal life 
He plays badminton after his father introduced him at 7 years old, and at 8 years old he joined the Suryanaga Surabaya Badminton Club. Currently, he joins the Tjakrindo Masters Badminton Club in Surabaya. His parents are Moch. Sumadji (father) and Asmiati (mother). His hobbies are fixing automobiles and hanging-out or travelling. Generally people call him Sony, which can also be spelled as Soni. On 24 July 2009, he married Gading Safitri, who became his coach and manager.

Career

2004 Summer Olympics 
Kuncoro played badminton at the 2004 Summer Olympics in men's singles, defeating M. Roslin Hashim of Malaysia and Jim Ronny Andersen of Norway in the first two rounds. In the quarterfinals, Kuncoro defeated Park Tae-sang of South Korea 15–13, 15–4. Kuncoro advanced to the semifinals, in which he lost to Shon Seung-mo of Korea 15–6, 9–15, 15–9. He defeated Boonsak Ponsana of Thailand by a score of 15–11, 17–16 in the bronze medal match.

2007 BWF World Championships 
He became runner-up at the 2007 IBF World Championships after losing to Lin Dan in straight sets with a score of 11–21, 20–22 in Putra Stadium, Bukit Jalil, Malaysia. During the tournament, he defeated Lee Chong Wei in the third round 21–9, 21–11 and Peter Gade in the quarter final, 22–20, 21–18. He also beat Chen Yu in the semifinal in 3 tough games.

2009 BWF World Championships 
He was bronze medalist at the 2009 BWF World Championships, again losing to Lin Dan, but this time in 3 sets, 16–21, 21–14, 15–21. En route to the semi, he beat Lee Chong Wei (world number one) in the quarter finals 21–16, 14–21, 21–12.

Other achievements 
He was runner-up in the World Junior Championships in 2000, defeated by Bao Chunlai in the final. He had good results in the Asian Badminton Championships, winning three titles. On 23 September 2007, Kuncoro won the Chinese Taipei Open Grand Prix Gold after beating Taufik Hidayat in the final round 18–21, 21–6, 21–13. He won the men's singles gold medal at the Southeast Asian Games in 2003 and 2005. At the SEA Games in 2007 and 2009, Sony helped the Indonesian team win gold in the men's team event.

In 2008, Kuncoro competed in Beijing Olympic Games but he was eliminated in the quarterfinal to the second seeded Lee Chong Wei in straight games. In June, he won the Indonesia Open Superseries beating Simon Santoso in the final 19–21, 21–14, 21–9 in Istora Senayan, Jakarta. In September, Kuncoro won the Japan Open Superseries beating Lee Chong Wei from Malaysia in straight sets 21–17, 21–11 in the final. Also in September, he captured the China Masters Superseries by beating China's Chen Jin 21–19, 21–18 in the final, thus becoming the first player to win the men's singles at three consecutive "superseries" tournaments.

In 2009, his best performance in Superseries was semifinalist in Indonesia Open, beaten by Taufik Hidayat, 17–21, 14–21 and in Denmark Open beaten by Marc Zwiebler of Germany in three tough games. In December, he again helped Indonesia win the Southeast Asian Games, beating Malaysia in the men teams final. He also finished second in the individual event, beaten by his teammate Simon Santoso.

In 2012, he won the men's singles title at the Thailand Open Grand Prix Gold defeating China's Chen Yuekun in straight games, 21–17, 21–14. In the semi final, he beat the top seed from China, Lin Dan also in straight games, 21–17, 21–16.

In 2013, he started the year by becoming the semifinalist in 2013 Korea Open Superseries Premier, beaten by Du Pengyu, 12–21 17–21 and in 2013 Indonesian Masters Grand Prix Gold, giving walkover to Dionysius Hayom Rumbaka. He became the finalist in 2013 Malaysia Open Superseries, beaten by Lee Chong Wei, 7–21 8–21 and in 2013 Hong Kong Open Superseries, again beaten by Lee Chong Wei, 13–21 9–21.

In 2015, his best performance was being the champion at 2015 Chinese Taipei Masters Grand Prix after beating Wang Tzu-wei of Chinese Taipei with score 21–13, 21–15. He also won the 2015 Indonesia International Challenge after defeat the Korean young blood Jeon Hyeok-jin with straight games 22–20, 21–15.

In 2016, he advanced to the main round of the 2016 Singapore Open Superseries after winning the qualification rounds. He later won the event after beating China's Lin Dan in the semi-final with score 21–10, 17–21, 22–20, then South Korea's Son Wan-ho in the final with 21–16, 13–21, 21–14. This is his first Superseries title win in six years. He last tasted success at this level on the same stage at the 2010 Singapore Open. The victory is proof that he has still got it. It’s a reward for his hard work as an independent shuttler after kicked out of the national training camp in mid-2014 because of injuries to his back, waist and wrist over the years.

Achievements

Olympic Games 
Men's singles

BWF World Championships 
Men's singles

Asian Championships 
Men's singles

Southeast Asian Games 
Men's singles

World Junior Championships 
Boys' singles

Asian Junior Championships 
Boys' singles

BWF Superseries (5 titles, 2 runners-up) 
The BWF Superseries, which was launched on 14 December 2006 and implemented in 2007, is a series of elite badminton tournaments, sanctioned by the Badminton World Federation (BWF). BWF Superseries levels are Superseries and Superseries Premier. A season of Superseries consists of twelve tournaments around the world that have been introduced since 2011. Successful players are invited to the Superseries Finals, which are held at the end of each year.

Men's singles

  Superseries tournament
  Superseries Premier tournament
  Superseries Finals tournament

BWF Grand Prix (4 titles, 3 runners-up) 
The BWF Grand Prix had two levels, the BWF Grand Prix and Grand Prix Gold. It was a series of badminton tournaments sanctioned by the Badminton World Federation (BWF) which was held from 2007 to 2017. The World Badminton Grand Prix sanctioned by International Badminton Federation (IBF) from 1983 to 2006.

Men's singles

  BWF Grand Prix Gold tournament
  BWF & IBF Grand Prix tournament

BWF International Challenge/Series (1 title, 3 runners-up) 

Men's singles

  BWF International Challenge tournament
  BWF International Series tournament

Participation at Indonesian team 
 4 times at Sudirman Cup (2003, 2005, 2007, 2009)
 4 times at Thomas Cup (2004, 2006, 2008, 2010)
 2 times at Asian Games (2004, 2008)
 4 times at Southeast Asian Games (2003, 2005, 2007, 2009)

Performance timeline

National team 
 Junior level

 Senior level

Individual competitions 
 Junior level

 Senior level

Record against selected opponents 
Head to head (H2H) against BWF Superseries finalists, World Championships semifinalists, and Olympic quarterfinalists.

  Bao Chunlai 3–7
  Chen Hong 4–3
  Chen Jin 2–3
  Chen Long 1–1
  Chen Yu 2–1
  Du Pengyu 3–2
  Lin Dan 3–9
  Tian Houwei 1–0
  Xia Xuanze 1–0
  Chou Tien-chen 0–2
  Hans-Kristian Vittinghus 0–1
  Jan Ø. Jørgensen 0–2
  Peter Gade 3–1
  Peter Rasmussen 0–2
  Viktor Axelsen 0–2
  Taufik Hidayat 2–3
  Tommy Sugiarto 3–2
  Parupalli Kashyap 3–0
  Sho Sasaki 5–1
  Lee Hyun-il 1–4
  Park Sung-hwan 2–6
  Shon Seung-mo 3–2
  Son Wan-ho 2–1
  Lee Chong Wei 5–10
  Wong Choong Hann 6–4
  Ronald Susilo 3–2
  Kunlavut Vitidsarn 1–1
  Boonsak Ponsana 5–4
  Nguyễn Tiến Minh 2–2

References

External links 

 
 
 
 His profile in Republika Online 
 Sony Dwi Kuncoro Harapan Baru Tunggal Pria Indonesia 

1984 births
Living people
Sportspeople from Surabaya
Javanese people
Indonesian male badminton players
Badminton players at the 2004 Summer Olympics
Badminton players at the 2008 Summer Olympics
Olympic badminton players of Indonesia
Olympic bronze medalists for Indonesia
Olympic medalists in badminton
Medalists at the 2004 Summer Olympics
Badminton players at the 2006 Asian Games
Badminton players at the 2010 Asian Games
Asian Games bronze medalists for Indonesia
Asian Games medalists in badminton
Medalists at the 2006 Asian Games
Medalists at the 2010 Asian Games
Competitors at the 2003 Southeast Asian Games
Competitors at the 2005 Southeast Asian Games
Competitors at the 2007 Southeast Asian Games
Competitors at the 2009 Southeast Asian Games
Southeast Asian Games gold medalists for Indonesia
Southeast Asian Games silver medalists for Indonesia
Southeast Asian Games medalists in badminton
21st-century Indonesian people